Below is a list of covered bridges in Maryland. There are six authentic covered bridges in the U.S. state of Maryland of which five are historic.  A covered bridge is considered authentic not due to its age, but by its construction. An authentic bridge is constructed using trusses rather than other methods such as stringers, a popular choice for non-authentic covered bridges.

Bridges

See also

 List of bridges on the National Register of Historic Places in Maryland
 World Guide to Covered Bridges

References

External links

 National Society for the Preservation of Covered Bridges
 Maryland's Six Existing Covered Bridges

Maryland
 
covered bridges
Bridges, covered